The Ottoman Caliphate, the world's last widely recognized caliphate, was abolished on 3 March 1924 (27 Rajab 1342 AH) by decree of the Grand National Assembly of Turkey. The process was one of Atatürk's reforms following the replacement of the Ottoman Empire with the Republic of Turkey. Abdulmejid II was deposed as the last Ottoman caliph, as was Mustafa Sabri as the last Ottoman shaykh al-Islām.

The caliph was nominally the supreme religious and political leader of all Muslims across the world. In the years prior to the abolition, during the ongoing Turkish Revolution, the uncertain future of the caliphate provoked strong reactions among the worldwide Sunni Islam community. The potential abolition of the caliphate had been actively opposed by the Indian-based Khilafat Movement, and generated heated debate throughout the Muslim world. The 1924 abolition came less than 18 months after the abolition of the Ottoman sultanate, prior to which the Ottoman sultan was ex officio caliph.

Mustafa Kemal Pasha (Atatürk) reportedly offered the caliphate to Ahmed Sharif as-Senussi, on the condition that he reside outside Turkey; Senussi declined the offer and confirmed his support for Abdulmejid. At least thirteen different candidates were proposed for the caliphate in subsequent years, but none was able to gain a consensus for the candidacy across the Islamic world. Candidates included Abdulmejid II, his predecessor Mehmed VI, King Hussein of Hejaz, King Yusef of Morocco, King Amanullah Khan of Afghanistan, Imam Yahya of Yemen, and King Fuad I of Egypt. Unsuccessful "caliphate conferences" were held in the Dutch East Indies (today Indonesia) in 1924, in 1926 in Cairo, and in 1931 in Jerusalem.

Ottoman pan-Islamism
In the late 19th century, Ottoman sultan Abdul Hamid II launched his pan-Islamist program in a bid to protect the Ottoman Empire from Western attack and dismemberment, and to crush the democratic opposition at home.

He sent an emissary, Jamāl al-Dīn al-Afghānī, to India in the late 19th century. The cause of the Ottoman monarch evoked religious passion and sympathy amongst Indian Muslims. A large number of Muslim religious leaders began working to spread awareness and develop Muslim participation on behalf of the caliphate; of these, Maulana Mehmud Hasan attempted to organize a national war of independence against the British Raj with support from the Ottoman Empire.

End of the sultanate

Following the Ottoman defeat in World War I, the Ottoman sultan under Allied direction attempted to suppress nationalist movements, and secured an official fatwa from the Sheikh ul-Islam declaring these to be un-Islamic. But the nationalists steadily gained momentum and began to enjoy widespread support. Many sensed that the nation was ripe for revolution. In an effort to neutralize this threat, the sultan agreed to hold elections, with the hope of placating and co-opting the nationalists. To his dismay, nationalist groups swept the polls, prompting the Allied Powers to dissolve the General Assembly of the Ottoman Empire in April 1920.

At the end of the Turkish War of Independence, the Turkish National Movement's Grand National Assembly voted to separate the caliphate from the sultanate and abolished the latter on 1 November 1922. Initially, the National Assembly seemed willing to allow a place for the caliphate in the new regime and Mustafa Kemal did not dare to abolish the caliphate outright, as it still commanded a considerable degree of support from the common people. The caliphate was symbolically vested in the House of Osman. On 19 November 1922, the Crown Prince Abdulmejid was elected caliph by the Turkish National Assembly at Ankara. He established himself in Istanbul (at that time Constantinople) on 24 November 1922. But the position had been stripped of any authority, and Abdulmejid's purely ceremonial reign would be short-lived.

When Abdulmejid was declared caliph, Kemal refused to allow the traditional Ottoman ceremony to take place, bluntly declaring: 

In response to Abdulmejid's petition for an increase in his allowance, Kemal wrote: 

On 29 October 1923, the National Assembly declared Turkey a republic, and proclaimed Ankara its new capital. After over 600 years, the Ottoman Empire had officially ceased to exist.

Collapse of the Caliphate

In March 1924, Muhammad al-Jizawi Rector of Cairo's prestigious al-Azhar University, in direct response to the collapse and the issue of preaching in such an environment, formulated a resolution:

Two Indian brothers, Mohammad Ali Jauhar and Maulana Shaukat Ali, leaders of the Indian-based Khilafat Movement, distributed pamphlets calling upon the Turkish people to preserve the Ottoman Caliphate for the sake of Islam. On 24 November 1923, Syed Ameer Ali and Aga Khan III sent a letter to İsmet Pasha (İnönü) on behalf of the movement. Under Turkey's new nationalist government, however, this was construed as foreign intervention; any form of foreign intervention was labelled an insult to Turkish sovereignty and worse, a threat to state security. Mustafa Kemal Pasha promptly seized his chance. On his initiative, the National Assembly abolished the caliphate on March 3, 1924. Abdulmejid was sent into exile along with the remaining members of the Ottoman House.

Aftermath

With the failure of the Muslim world to find consensus on establishing a new Caliphate, the institution of the Caliphate entered a period of dormancy.

In Egypt, debate focused on a controversial book by Ali Abdel Raziq which argued for secular government and against a caliphate.

Today, two frameworks for pan-Islamic coordination exist: the Muslim World League and the Organisation of Islamic Cooperation, both of which were founded in the 1960s.

The most active group that exists to re-establish the caliphate is Hizb ut-Tahrir, founded in 1953 as a political organization in then Jordanian-controlled Jerusalem by Taqiuddin al-Nabhani, an Islamic scholar and appeals court judge from Haifa. This organization has spread to more than 50 countries, and grown to a membership estimated to be between "tens of thousands" to "about one million".

Islamist organizations such as the Federated Islamic State of Anatolia (based in Germany, 1994–2001) and the Islamic State of Iraq and the Levant (1999–present, declaration of caliphate in 2014) declared that they had re-established the Caliphate, although these claims received little acknowledgment from other Muslims.

See also 
 Abolition of the Ottoman sultanate
 Kemalism
 Outline and timeline of the Greek genocide

References

Bibliography
 
 
 
 
 
 
 
 
 
 
 
 
 
 
 
 
 
 

Caliphates
1924 in Turkey
History of Islam
1924 disestablishments
Mustafa Kemal Atatürk
Reform movements